Venturoli is an Italian surname. Notable people with the surname include:

Angelo Venturoli (1749–1821), Italian architect
Giacomo Venturoli, 17th century Italian mathematician

Italian-language surnames